A probabilistic proposition is a statement or claim that expresses the likelihood or probability of an event occurring. In other words, it is a statement that can be assigned a probability value based on available data or evidence.

For example, the statement "It will rain tomorrow" is a probabilistic proposition because it is not certain whether it will rain or not, but we can estimate the probability of rain based on past weather patterns, current weather conditions, and other relevant factors. We might assign a probability of 70% to this statement, indicating that there is a 70% chance that it will rain tomorrow.

It's important to note that the probability of a probabilistic proposition may vary depending on the person and time period in question. For example, a statement like "Most people prefer chocolate ice cream to vanilla" may be true for one population at one time, but it may not be true for another population at a different time. The measured probability of a proposition is therefore context-dependent and subject to change.

Probabilistic propositions are commonly used in fields such as statistics, probability theory, and artificial intelligence. They are useful for making predictions, estimating risks, and evaluating the strength of evidence for or against a hypothesis.

Probability interpretations
Propositions